Nguyễn Thị Ngọc Châu (born 6 December 1994) is a Vietnamese model, actress, and beauty pageant titleholder who was crowned Miss Universe Vietnam 2022. She represented  Vietnam in Miss Universe 2022.

Ngọc Châu was previously crowned as Miss Supranational Vietnam 2018 and was the winner of Vietnam's Next Top Model 2016. She represented Vietnam at the Miss Supranational 2019 pageant and finished as a Top 10 semifinalist.

Early life 
Nguyễn Thị Ngọc Châu was born in Tây Ninh province, Vietnam on December 6, 1994. She studied Biotechnology at Ton Duc Thang University.

Modeling

Vietnam's Next Top Model
At the beginning of the competition, Ngọc Châu was not regarded highly by the judges as she did not know how to handle photoshoots well. However, she managed to pull through the earlier episodes and was only considered for elimination in episode 7. At the half-way point, however, Ngọc Châu started to have many breakthroughs towards the finale. Being able to take advantage of her beautiful face, good body, and diverse expressions, she repeatedly finished the later episodes in Top 3 and finished first three times. In particular, in her collaboration with Angela Phuong Trinh in episode 10, despite Angela's initial reservations about Ngọc Châu's ability to do difficult poses in photoshoots, Ngọc Châu still performed well and finished first. She ended up being chosen as the winner of that season in the final episode, becoming the contestant with the shortest height among the winners of the show. 

After the show, Ngoc Chau's appearance at fashion shows surpassed many famous Vietnamese models before continuously performing in fashion shows of popular Vietnamese designers such as: Do Manh Cuong, Chung Thanh Phong, Le Thanh Hoa, Adrian Anh Tuan, Ha Linh Thu, Phuong My, Nguyen Cong Tri, Xuan Paris, Phan Anh Tuan, etc. She also partook in the 2017 Seoul Fashion Week in the collection of designer Chung Chung Lee and many other designers. Many experts in the model industry claimed that Ngoc Chau is one of the most sought-after models in Vietnam in 2017.

Pageantry

Miss Supranational Vietnam 2018
Ngọc Châu was crowned Miss Supranational Vietnam 2018 in the finale at the Walker Hill Theater in Seoul, South Korea. In the question and answer portion of the finale, after receiving the question: "If you are to choose whether God will give you wisdom, beauty, or compassion, what would you choose? And why?", she answered that : "If I could choose whether God will give me one of those things, I would choose compassion. In modern society, people are increasingly forgetting the good nature of humanity and kindness. I believe that kindness, tolerance, and forgiveness will bring people closer to each other and help them understand each other better".

Miss Supranational 2019
After winning Miss Supranational Vietnam, she was chosen to represent Vietnam at Miss Supranational 2019.

She ended up in Top 10 in the finale and won the title "Miss Supranational Asia".

Miss Universe Vietnam 2022
On June 25, 2022, Ngọc Châu again participated in Miss Universe Vietnam 2022 held at the Saigon Exhibition and Convention Center in Ho Chi Minh City.

During the competition, Ngọc Châu won the following awards:
Miss Bravery (Top 4)
Best Talent (Top 10)
Best Face (Top 10)
Best in National Costume (Top 10)
Best in Catwalk (Top 10)
Best Introduction (Top 10)
Best Interview (Top 11)
Best Body
Best English Skills (Top 10)
Miss TikTok (Top 12)

At the end of the competition, Ngọc Châu won and was crowned Miss Universe Vietnam 2022.

Miss Universe 2022
Ngọc Châu represented Vietnam at the 71st Miss Universe competition but failed to advance to Top 16, ending Vietnam’s four-year streak of placements in the Miss Universe pageant, from 2018 through 2021. R'Bonney Gabriel of the United States won at the end of the pageant.

After the competition, she was awarded as the winner of Swimsuit Cape Vote.

References 

1994 births
21st-century Vietnamese actresses
Living people
Miss Universe 2022 contestants
People from Tây Ninh province
Vietnamese beauty pageant winners
Vietnamese female models
Vietnamese film actresses